Papilioninae is a subfamily of the butterfly family Papilionidae. Papilioninae are found worldwide, but most species are distributed in the tropics. There are roughly 480 species, of which 27 occur in North America.

Tribes
This subfamily consists of the following tribes:

 Leptocircini
 Papilionini
 Troidini

References
 The Butterflies of North America, James A. Scott, 1986

External links
 
 

Papilionidae
Butterfly subfamilies